Târgu (Romanian for "the market") starts off the names of several places in Romania:

Târgu Bujor
Târgu Cărbunești
Târgu Frumos
Târgu Gânguleşti
Târgu Jiu
Târgu Lăpuș
Târgu Logreşti
Târgu Mureș
Târgu Neamț
Târgu Ocna
Târgu Secuiesc
Târgu Trotuș

See also
Târg